Kir Stefan the Serb (second half of the 14th and 15th century) was a Serbian monk, protopsaltos, musicologist, choirmaster and more importantly, composer of the chants developed within the sphere of the activities of Byzantine culture in the Serbian state. Together with (but independently from) Isaiah the Serb and Nikola the Serb he followed faithfully the Byzantine musical traditions, writing in the late kalophonic style of the 14th and 15th centuries. With his distinctive compositional style, he is one of the earliest (if not the earliest) identifiable Medieval Serbian composers and also one of the original founders of new and distinctive style called Serbo-Byzantine school.

Life
The presence of Greeks in the courts of Serbian despots who had been reared since their early infancy in the spirit of Romaic culture, had additionally intensified the need for liturgical services to be as magnificent as possible, like those in Constantinople. The fact that chanted services were taking place under the watchful eyes of professional musicians is confirmed by high ranks of those 
musicians we are familiar with today. Joachim, monk of the Harsianites, probably Greek by birth, was a domestikos in Serbia, just as one of the three Serbian composers of the 15th century, Kir Stefan.

The direct information about his life are scarce and often self-contradictory. 
Previous research has shown that Stefan lived in the 14th and 15th century. Traces of his existence are found in the monastery in Kumanovo, in today's North Macedonia and in Putna monastery in Romania. However, evidence show that he spent most of his life at the court of Despot Lazar Branković in Smederevo, where he served as domestikos — choir conductor and dijak — clerk. Some sources say he lived from 1360 to 1430, and that he became Hegumen, protopsaltos and domestikos of the monastery of Hilandar in his later life, the position he probably undertook to escape the Turkish occupation of Serbia.
A number of original Stefan's texts and manuscripts are preserved in foreign libraries, in Vatican, Moscow, Athens and in the library of the monasteries of Hilandar, Great Lavra, Iviron and Simonopetra.

Works
A certain number of medieval Serbian manuscripts record the neumatic note signs. Their author was probably Stefan.
His works reveal common melodic-rhythmical characteristics; these short, single voice liturgical songs of graduated steps (larger jumps between notes indicate important words) make up an inseparable whole with the text. They are based on a few fundamental nuclei which consistently appear in the songs, with variations or in individual fragments. Some of them have rich melismata, have retained expression and flexibility, and can portray both dramatic and lyric moods.

However, his most famous work - a treatise on the theory of Byzantine music and also an anthology of liturgical hymns Psaltikia was among the most important documents of the Medieval Serbian musical culture, being the only musical manuscript in Slavic language from the 15th century.
The original manuscript of Psalatikia was kept in the National Library of Serbia in Belgrade, unfortunately it perished on the 6 April 1941, when the entire library burned down after the bombardment; in 1937 Serbian composer Kosta Manojlović took 12 photographs of the manuscript but only photocopies remained, among them nine Serbian songs. The two songs "Нинїa Сили" (Now the Celestial Powers) and "ВькȢсите и Видите" (Taste and see) have the original autograph by Stefan himself: "Творение доместика Кир Стефана Србина" (f. 287 V, f. 288),  meaning that he was their author.
Psaltikija was written in late Byzantine John Kukuzelis neumatic notation with Old Church Slavonic and Medieval Greek texts. Beside the liturgical hymns, Psaltikia also offered theoretic interpretations i.e. пападика with Οld Church Slavonic musical terminology. Instructions are mainly related to the pace (the speed) and dynamics (strength, design of music phrase). The margins of this manuscript indicate that it was used by domestics and monks. The letters of the Early Cyrillic alphabet had the values of melodic modes (азъ, боукы, вѣдѣ, глаголи, добро, єсть, живѣтє, ѕѣло). Scientists generally agree that Serbian system of eight modes is somewhat different than its Byzantine model and thus closer to the liturgical systems of the earlier Christians from Antiochia and Syria. Stefan explained the theory of the music with a system of concentric circles, corresponding to the natural cycles of the planets.

Legacy
Even though the existence of Psaltikia was known from the beginning of the 20th century, the most fundamental analysis of the remaining pages has been compiled only in 1961 by Serbian musicologist Dimitrije Stefanović, the director of the Musicological Institute SANU, who also transcribed Stefan's song to the contemporary notation. Soon after, the first performance of Stefan's songs was given in the Church of St. Sophia, Ohrid, SR Macedonia in the 1961. In the following years, kir Stefan the Serb became recognized as the first Serbian (Medieval) composer and epitome for Serbian Medieval music and culture.

He is included in The 100 most prominent Serbs.

Partial list of works
Besides the Psaltikia, kir Stefan is an author of the number of melodies. His longest work "Нинїa Сили" is actually a Cherubicon meant to be sung during the Great feast. Four other compositions in Greek and Slavic are preserved in 12 manuscripts from 14-15th century; some are kept in the Greek libraries, while the others are from the Romanian monastery of Putna. Stefan's compositions display gradual development of the main melismatic motive in well-tempered melodic movement upwards and downwards, subtle repetitions with wide melodic ambitus, leap of the fifths and distinctive rhythmic motives. They are also very skillfully balanced in combination of different musical sections, and almost always faithful to the single musical mode, thus rather modified in tonality.

Нинїa Сили this hymn also existed in the analogous Greek version Νυν αι δυνάμεις, written by Stefan himself.
ВькȢсите и Видите another communion hymn
Γεύσασθε και ίδετε the Greek version of the ВькȢсите preserved in the Manuscript no. 928 of the National Library of Greece
Σώμα Χριστού a third communion hymn found in the manuscript of Leimonos.
ПомилȢи Ме Боже
ᾌσατε Τῷ Κυρίῳ which is in fact Psalm 96. This hymn can be found in the manuscripts of the monastery of Leimonos on the island of Lesbos and the Central University Library of Iași, Romania
Cherubic hymn (found in one Ruthenian manuscript from the Ukraine).

See also
Kir Joakim
Isaiah the Serb
Nikola the Serb
Music of Serbia
Music of Old Serbia
John Koukouzelis

References

External links
, performing one of Kir Stefan's works

15th-century Serbian people
15th-century Christian monks
15th-century composers
Christian hymnwriters
Medieval Serbian Orthodox clergy
Serbian monks
Serbian composers
Medieval singers
People of the Serbian Despotate
Medieval male composers